Floodtide is a 1950 historical novel by the American writer Frank Yerby. It was ranked seventh on the Publishers Weekly list of bestselling novels that year. Like many of his works of the era it is set in the South during the nineteenth century.

Synopsis
Ross Pary, the son of a saloon from the poor district of Natchez Under-the-Hill, schemes and fights his way up to join the slaveowner plantation elite of Mississippi.

References

Bibliography
 Hill, James Lee. Anti-heroic Perspectives: The Life and Works of Frank Yerby. University of Iowa, 1976. 
 Korda, Michael. Making the List: A Cultural History of the American Bestseller, 1900–1999 : as Seen Through the Annual Bestseller Lists of Publishers Weekly. Barnes & Noble Publishing, 2001.

1950 American novels
American historical novels
Novels by Frank Yerby
Dial Press books
Novels set in the 19th century
Novels set in Mississippi